F5, F.V, F 5, F05 or F-5 may refer to:

Transportation
 SpaceX Falcon 5 proposed space launch rocket

Aircraft
 F 5 Ljungbyhed, a Swedish Air Force training wing 
 Caproni Trento F-5, a jet aircraft of the 1950s
 Caproni Vizzola F.5, an Italian fighter aircraft of 1939
 Felixstowe F.5, a 1918 British flying boat
 Fokker F.V, a 1922 Dutch aircraft 
 Northrop F-5, a jet light fighter
 F-5 Lightning, a photo-reconnaissance version of the Lockheed P-38 Lightning
 Shenyang F-5, a version of the Chinese Shenyang J-5 jet fighter

Automobiles
 BYD F5, a Chinese compact sedan
 DKW F5, a German subcompact sedan
 Haval F5, a Chinese compact SUV
 Hennessey Venom F5, an American sports car

Roads and routes
 F-05 (Michigan county highway)
 Vermont Route F-5, state highway in Vermont

Locomotives
 LNER Class F5, a class of British steam locomotives

Other
 F5 (band), a rock band
 F5 (classification), a wheelchair sport classification
 F5 mandolin, a musical instrument
 F5, Inc., a manufacturer of network equipment
 F5 Tower, a skyscraper in Seattle, Washington
 Neutral Bay ferry services in Sydney Australia, known as the F5
 Cosmic Air (IATA airline designator), an airline in Kathmandu, Nepal
 Factor V, a protein of the coagulation system
 Factsheet Five, a magazine sometimes referred as F5
 Faugère F5 algorithm, for computing the Gröbner basis of an ideal of a multivariate polynomial ring
 Nikon F5, a camera
 F5 tornado, the highest intensity rating on the Fujita scale
 F-5, trademark finishing move of American professional wrestler Brock Lesnar
 F5, a function key

See also
 FV (disambiguation) 
 5F (disambiguation)